Daphne tangutica, syn. Daphne retusa, is a species of flowering plant in the family Thymelaeaceae, native to Tibet, China, and possibly Taiwan. The flowers are often followed by red berries. It grows in forests.

The Latin specific epithet tangutica refers to an historical tribe in what is now north western China, but has become a synonym for Tibet, part of the plant's native range.

This plant has gained the Royal Horticultural Society's Award of Garden Merit, as has D. tangutica Retusa Group.

References

tangutica
Flora of China
Flora of Tibet
Flora of Taiwan